Almería is a city and municipality of Spain, located in Andalusia. It is the capital of the province of the same name. It lies on southeastern Iberia on the Mediterranean Sea. Caliph Abd al-Rahman III founded the city in 955. The city grew wealthy during the Islamic era, becoming a world city throughout the 11th and 12th centuries. It enjoyed an active port that traded silk, oil and raisins. Being adjacent to a small desert, Almería has an exceptionally dry climate by European standards.

Etymology 
The name "Almería" comes from the city's former Arabic name, Madīnat al-Mariyya, meaning "city of the watchtower". As the settlement was originally port or coastal suburb of Pechina, it was initially known as Mariyyat al-Bajjāna (Bajjāna being the Arabic name for Pechina).

History

The origin of Almería is connected to the 9th-century establishment of the so-called Republic of Pechina (Bajjana) some kilometres to the north, which was for a time autonomous from the Cordobese central authority: the settlement of current-day Almería initially developed as a humble trading port of Pechina known as Al-Mariyya Bajjana. Pechina and its maritime port experienced divergent fortunes, and while the former progressively depopulated, the latter became the base of the Caliphal navy after 933, during the rule of Abd-ar-Rahman III. Furthermore, in 955, Abd-ar-Rahman III decided to erect the walls. A silk industry consisting of hundreds of looms and feeding itself from the mulberry trees planted in region, fostered Almería's economy. Almería also became an important slave trade hub during the caliphal period.

In the wake of the collapse of the Caliphate of Córdoba in the early 11th century, Almería detached from Cordobese authority towards 1014 and became ruled as an independent taifa under Slavic kinglets. It submitted to the Taifa of Valencia in 1038, yet it soon became independent as a new taifa, ruled by the Arab Banu Sumadih until 1091, when it fell to Almoravid control. This allowed the city's economy to insert itself into the trade networks of the Almoravid empire. Building upon the previous development during the caliphal period, Almería reached a degree of historical relevance unmatched in the rest of its history throughout the 11th and 12th centuries, becoming the third-largest city of Al-Andalus. Almería imported indigo dye and wool from the Maghreb and linen from Egypt, while it exported copper to Fez and Tlemcen as well as its highly sought textiles.

Contested by the emirs of Granada and Valencia, Almería experienced many sieges, including one especially fierce siege when Christians, called to the Second Crusade by Pope Eugene III, were also encouraged to counter the Muslim forces on a more familiar coast. On that occasion Alfonso VII, starting on 11 July 1147, at the head of mixed armies of Catalans, Genoese, Pisans and Franks, led a crusade against the rich city, and Almería was captured on 17 October 1147, marking the breakup of the city's period of splendor in the Middle Ages.

Within a decade, in 1157, Almería had passed to the control of Muslim Almohad rulers. Almería soon passed by the temporary overarching control of rebel Murcian emir Ibn Mardanish (1165–1169), hindering the early efforts of recovery in the city, that under the decade of Christian occupation reportedly had been left depopulated and, by and large, quite destroyed. During Almohad rule, the city did not return to its previous splendor, although the port remained trading with the Crown of Aragon and the Italian republics.

Following the rebellion against Almohad rule heralded by the likes of the Banu Hud and the Banu Mardanis, Almería submitted to the authority of Ibn Hud, who had raised the black banner and pledged nominal allegiance to Abbasid authorities by 1228. After Ibn Hud's assassination in Almería in 1238, the bulk of the remaining Muslim-controlled territories in the Iberian Peninsula passed to the control of rival ruler Ibn al-Aḥmar (sultan since 1232), who had set the capital of his emirate in Granada by 1238, constituting the Emirate of Granada, to which Almería belonged from then on. While relatively languishing throughout the Nasrid period, Almería still remained a key strategic port of the emirate together with Málaga, as well as a haven for pirates and political dissidents. It sustained intense trading relations with Aragon and the African port of Hunayn. Almería endured a brutal siege by Aragonese forces in 1309 that, while eventually unsuccessful, left the city battered.

The city submitted to the sovereignty of the Catholic Monarchs on December 22, 1489. Relatively isolated and within the range of attacks from Barbary pirates, the hitherto mercantile city entered modernity by undergoing a process of heavy ruralization that imperiled its very same continued existence as a city.

The 16th century was for Almería a century of natural and human catastrophes; for there were at least four earthquakes, of which the one in 1522 was especially violent, devastating the city. The people who had remained Muslim were expelled from Almería after the War of Las Alpujarras in 1568 and scattered across Spain. Landings and attacks by Barbary pirates were also frequent in the 16th century, and continued until the early 18th century. At that time, huge iron mines were discovered and French and British companies set up business in the area, bringing renewed prosperity and returning Almería to a position of relative importance within Spain.

During the Spanish Civil War the city was shelled by the German Navy, with news reaching the London and Parisian press about the "criminal bombardment of Almería by German planes". Almería surrendered in 1939, being the last Andalusian main city to fall to Francoist forces.

In the second half of the 20th century, Almería witnessed spectacular economic growth due to tourism and intensive agriculture, with crops grown year-round in massive invernaderos – plastic-covered "greenhouses" – for intensive vegetable production.

After Franco's death and popular approval of the new Spanish Constitution, the people of southern Spain were called on to approve an autonomous status for Andalusia region in a referendum. The referendum were approved with 118,186 votes for and 11,092 votes against in Almería province, which represented 42% of all registered voters.

Main sights
The Alcazaba, a medieval fortress that was begun in the 10th century but destroyed by an earthquake in 1522. It includes a triple line of walls, a majestic keep and large gardens. It commands a city quarter with buildings dressed in pastel colors, of Muslim-age aspect. It is the second largest among the Muslim fortresses of Andalusia, after the Alhambra.
Almería air raid shelters, underground galleries for civilian protection during the Spanish Civil War, currently the longest in Europe open for tourists.
The Cathedral has a fortress-like appearance due to its towers, merlons and protected paths, created to defend it from Mediterranean pirates. Originally designated as a mosque, it was later converted into a Christian church, before being destroyed in the 1522 earthquake. In the 16th century it was rebuilt in the Renaissance style, whilst keeping some of its defensive features.
Renaissance church of Santiago, built in 1533, with tower and portal decorated with reliefs.
Chanca, a group of houses carved into rocks.
Castle of San Cristobal, now in ruins. It is connected to the Alcazaba by a line of walls.
Museum of Almería. Includes findings from Prehistoric, Iberic, Roman, Greek ages and Muslim objects, mostly from the Alcazaba.
Paseo de Coches, a modern seaside promenade with gardens and palms.
Cable Inglés (English Pier), 1904 iron railway pier built to transfer iron ore, copper, and silver produced by British- and French-run mines in Granada from trains to waiting cargo ships.

Demographics

People and culture

Famous natives of Almería include Nicolás Salmerón y Alonso, who in 1873 was the third president of the First Spanish Republic, as well as several musicians, including the composer José Padilla Sánchez, whose music was declared of "universal interest" by Unesco in 1989, the popular folk singer Manolo Escobar, renowned Flamenco guitar player José Tomás "Tomatito" and Grammy Award winner David Bisbal; the champion motorcyclist Antonio Maeso moved to Almería as a child.

The Irish folk-rock group The Pogues paid tribute to Almería in "Fiesta," a song on the band's third album, If I Should Fall from Grace with God.

In 1989, English electronic band Depeche Mode filmed the video for their song "Personal Jesus" in Almería.

The tourism increased and hotels were all occupied from January to February during the filming of the sixth season of the TV series Game of Thrones.

Sports 

Almería hosted the Mediterranean Games in 2005. The city has 2 football teams: UD Almería, which was promoted to La Liga, the top tier of Spanish football, in 2022 and CP Almería, which plays in the División de Honor, the sixth tier.

The Plaza de toros de Almería is the main bullring in Almería. It has a capacity of 10,000 and it opened in 1882.

Films

Economy

Intensive agriculture has been the most important economic sector of Almería for the last 50 years. Nowadays, greenhouse's production, handling and commercialisation of vegetables, and the supply industry of the sector, represent almost 40% of Almería's GDP. Directly, agricultural production accounts for 18.2% of the provincial GDP. In Andalusia, the average contribution is 6.6% and in Spain it is only 2.9%.

This situation is the result of a great dynamic model, which can continually incorporate new technologies: using soil sanding, plastic covers, drip irrigation systems, hybrid seeds, soil-less cultivation, irrigation programs, new greenhouse structures, and so on. They all allowed to improve production and increase commercialisation calendars, assuring the profitability and quality of the crops and the competitiveness of the markets. Moreover, Almería's economy has an important exporting vocation: 75% of production was sold abroad in 2018, with a value of 2.400 million euros.

This development is explained by familiar investment, as subsidies have been limited or non-existent. In this sense, the horticultural sector receives the least European aids from the Common Agricultural Policy: 1.9% of total income. This figure is much lower than that received by other sectors such as olive groves (33%) or cereals (53%).

The production of this area is based on a fair competition with officially a just remuneration of employees, with similar salaries than the ones in the same sector in Europe: 8% higher than Italy and 11% than Belgium. This avoids the social dumping exerted by non-EU countries, like Morocco, with salaries up to 90% lower than those of Almería. However, there is well-documented widespread exploitation of workers from North Africa who work and live in terrible conditions, earning much lower than the minimum wage. 

From a social point of view, Almería and Granada are an example of familiar agriculture, with small farms and little concentration of land. This social nature generates high equity in the level of income and welfare, that is, social cohesion is produced, and inequality is reduced. Concretely, Almería is made up of 12.500 farms with an extension of 2,5 hectares and a 30% of familiar labour. It is also important the high education levels of the farmers, who shows an innovative and receptive character when it comes to continuing learning: 81,2% have some type of official academic training.

At the same time, a commercial system based on social economy enterprises has been developed, e.g. as cooperative societies. These companies represent the 62% of production and sales.  They assure the access to the market in optimal conditions, because they increase its position inside the agri-food supply chain, facilitate financing, technical advice, and incorporation of technology. Moreover, local ties increase environmental sustainability.

Transport

By land, Almería can be reached by the A-7 Mediterranean Highway, which connects the Mediterranean area with the Spanish A-92 that unites it with the rest of Andalusia. Almería railway station is served by Renfe Operadora with direct rail services to Granada, and Madrid Atocha using a branch off the Alcázar de San Juan–Cádiz railway; the Linares Baeza–Almería railway. In the future, high-speed rail AVE services will link Almería to Madrid via Murcia.  The central railway station has been closed for several months and it is not known exactly when it will re-open.  Passengers currently start their journey by being bussed a few kilometres to Huercal de Almería station.

By sea, the port of Almería has connections to Melilla, Algeria, Morocco, and tourist cruises in the Mediterranean. It also has a marina with moorings for pleasure boats. Currently the port of Almería is being expanded with new docks and transformed into a container port to take large-scale international shipping and thereby increase its freight traffic. It normally connects with the following destinations:
Acciona: Ghazaouet (Algeria), Oran (Algeria), Nador (Morocco) and Melilla.
Comarit: Nador.
Comanav: Nador.

By air, Almería is served by Almería Airport, the fourth largest in Andalusia.  The winter timetable includes flights to Madrid, Barcelona, Melilla, London, and Seville, with international connections to Manchester, Birmingham, Brussels, Dublin and Swiss, German and other EU airports being added during the summer.

Geography

Due to its arid landscape, numerous Spaghetti Westerns were filmed in Almería and some of the sets still remain as a tourist attraction.
These sets are located in the desert of Tabernas. The town and region were also used by David Lean in Lawrence of Arabia (1962), John Milius in The Wind and the Lion (1975) and others.

One of Almería's most famous natural spots is the Cabo de Gata-Níjar Natural Park. This park is of volcanic origin, and is the largest and most ecologically significant marine-terrestrial space in the European Western Mediterranean Sea. The Cabo de Gata-Níjar Natural Park runs through the municipal areas of Níjar, Almerimar and Carboneras. Its villages, previously dedicated to fishing, have become tourism spots. The beaches of Cabo de Gata-Níjar Natural Park are also an attraction.

Almería has one islet that it administers as a part of its territory in the Alboran Sea, Alboran Island. The island has a small cemetery, a harbor, and a lighthouse, built in the 19th century.

Climate
It is one of the driest zones on both shores of the Mediterranean coast.

The BWh climate is present in the city of Almería, in nearby areas of Almería province (such as the Cabo de Gata-Níjar Natural Park, the Andarax/Almanzora river valleys), the only region in Europe to have this climate (this excludes the Canary Islands, which are also part of Spain but geographically belong to the continent of Africa, which have a hot desert climate on most of the islands, specifically on the islands of Fuerteventura and Lanzarote in the Province of Las Palmas). With an average annual temperature above , it also qualifies as the 3rd warmest city in continental Europe, after Seville and Athens. This arid climatic region spreads along the coastline around Almería to Torrevieja, in the northeast. The nearby Faro del Cabo in the Cabo de Gata-Níjar Natural Park, has the lowest annual precipitation on the European continent (156mm).

Almería also experiences the warmest winters of any city on the European continent with a population over 100,000, having hot and dry summers, with precipitation rare between June and August (July and August have in average 0.3 rainy days). Almería enjoys about 3,000 hours of sunshine with over 320 sunny days per year on average (6 hours of sunshine in January and 12 in July) so it is one of the sunniest cities in Europe.

Almería is unique, for a city in Continental Europe, for not having any registered temperature under the freezing mark in its recorded weather history.

At night, the minimum temperature is usually around 8–10 °C (47–50 °F). This makes Almería the city with the second warmest winters in Spain and Europe, just after Cádiz.

Though temperatures above  are very rare in the city of Almería.

During the warmest months - July and August, the sky is usually cloudless and almost no rainfall occurs. The typical daily temperatures are around  during the day while the minimum temperatures stay around  during July and August.

Crystal cave
In 2000, a team of geologists found a cave filled with giant gypsum crystals in an abandoned silver mine near Almería. The cavity, which measures , may be the largest geode ever found. The entrance of the cave was blocked by five tons of rocks, and was under police protection (to prevent looters from entering). According to geological models, the cave was formed during the Messinian salinity crisis 6 million years ago, when the Mediterranean sea evaporated and left thick layers of salt sediments (evaporites). The site is currently open for tourists under guided tours.

Festivities 
The festive events that occur in the municipality are listed below:

 Carnival
 Holy Week
 Cruces de mayo
 Saint Joan's Eve

Notable people 
 José Tomás "Tomatito" (born 1958), flamenco guitar player.
 Lita Baron (1923-2015), actress, singer and dancer; she was born in Almería. 
 David Bisbal (born 1979), Grammy Award winner.
 Francisco Losada (1612-1667), composer.
 Nieves Navarro (born 1938), actress.
 Manuel Lao Hernández, founder of Cirsa, Spain's largest casino operator
 Rosa García-Malea López (born 1981), first female fighter pilot in the Spanish Air Force
 Juan Martínez Oliver (born 1964), road bicycle racer.
 Eduardo del Pino Vicente, journalist and writer.
 Chus Lampreave (1930-2016), actress who died in Almería.
 Jimena Quirós (1899-1983), Spanish scientist considered the first female oceanographer in the country and the first female staff scientist of the Spanish Institute for Oceanography (IEO)

See also 
 Solar Almeria Platform

References

Notes

Sources

External links
 Postal codes in Almería

 
955 establishments
Mediterranean port cities and towns in Spain
Municipalities in the Province of Almería
Province of Almería
10th-century establishments in Al-Andalus
Populated places established in the 10th century
Populated coastal places in Spain